The Taiwanese Ambassador to Eswatini is the official representative of the Republic of China to the Kingdom of Eswatini.

List of representatives

References 

Eswatini
China
China–Eswatini relations